Frances Claire Wilson (born 7 November 1991) is an English cricketer. A right handed batter and right arm off break bowler, she was born in Farnham in Surrey and plays for Gloucestershire, Western Storm and Welsh Fire. She previously played for Somerset, Middlesex, Kent, Sunrisers, Oval Invincibles and Canterbury.  She has appeared for the England Academy Women's team and the England Cricket Board Development Women's XI.  She made her One Day International debut against Sri Lanka at Colombo on 15 November 2010 and played her first Twenty20 International game for her country four days later. In October 2021, Wilson announced her retirement from international cricket.

Career
In April 2015, she was named as one of the England women's Academy squad tour to Dubai, where England women will play their Australian counterparts in two 50-over games, and two Twenty20 matches.  Although not in the initial England Women's Ashes squad, she was added to the party at the beginning of August, after poor performances from Amy Jones.

Wilson was a member of the winning women's team at the 2017 Women's Cricket World Cup held in England.

She made her Test debut for England Women against Australia Women on 9 November 2017 in the Women's Ashes.

In November 2018, she was added to England's squad for the 2018 ICC Women's World Twenty20, after Katherine Brunt was ruled out with a back injury. In February 2019, she was awarded a full central contract by the England and Wales Cricket Board (ECB) for 2019. In June 2019, the ECB named her in England's squad for their opening match against Australia to contest the Women's Ashes. In January 2020, she was named in England's squad for the 2020 ICC Women's T20 World Cup in Australia.

On 18 June 2020, Wilson was named in a squad of 24 players to begin training ahead of international women's fixtures starting in England following the COVID-19 pandemic. In June 2021, Wilson was named as in England's Test squad for their one-off match against India. In 2021, she was drafted by Oval Invincibles for the inaugural season of The Hundred and won the title with them.

In October 2021, Wilson announced her retirement from international cricket. The following month, it was announced that she had joined Western Storm, from Sunrisers, and in 2022 it was announced that she had also left Kent, due to her cricketing commitments in the South West. It was later announced that she had joined Gloucestershire, as both a player and an age-group coach.

In April 2022, she was signed by the Welsh Fire for the 2022 season of The Hundred.

References

External links

1991 births
Living people
People from Farnham
England women Test cricketers
England women One Day International cricketers
England women Twenty20 International cricketers
Somerset women cricketers
Middlesex women cricketers
Kent women cricketers
Gloucestershire women cricketers
Western Storm cricketers
Sunrisers women's cricketers
Wellington Blaze cricketers
Canterbury Magicians cricketers
Hobart Hurricanes (WBBL) cricketers
Sydney Thunder (WBBL) cricketers
Oval Invincibles cricketers
Welsh Fire cricketers